Dewey Hughes (born 1932) is an African American former radio personality and was Petey Greene's manager.

Early life
Dewey Hughes was born in South Carolina in 1932.

Career
Hughes was introduced to Petey Greene by his older brother Milo at Lorton Reformatory and hired Greene to work as a disc jockey at WOL. Hughes also worked as co-producer and director of Greene's television talk show Petey Greene's Washington from 1976 to 1982. Greene succumbed to liver cancer on January 10, 1984.

Hughes purchased WOL with his then-wife, Cathy Hughes, in Washington which became the cornerstone of the Radio One Network. He went on to win 12 Emmy Awards as a producer/director for an NBC affiliate.

Personal life
Hughes was married to Cathy Hughes from 1979 to 1987 and currently lives in Los Angeles, California where he writes and produces music. He has a son, Michael Genet, an actor and screenwriter.

In film
Hughes was portrayed by Chiwetel Ejiofor in the 2007 film Talk to Me.  The screenplay for the film was written by his son, Michael Genet.

References 

1932 births
Businesspeople from Washington, D.C.
Urban One
Living people
20th-century American businesspeople
American television producers
American radio producers
African-American television producers
20th-century African-American people
21st-century African-American people